The Cassandra complex is a psychological phenomenon in which an individual's accurate prediction of a crisis is ignored or dismissed.

Cassandra Complex may also refer to:

 The Cassandra Complex (band), an electronic music band
 The Cassandra Complex (EP), a 2003 demo EP by the band From a Second Story Window